D. indicus may refer to:
 Deinococcus indicus, a species of arsenic-resistant bacterium
 Dendronanthus indicus, the forest wagtail, a medium-sized passerine bird
Dohertyorsidis indicus, a species of longhorn beetle
Domibacillus indicus, a species of bacterium found in marine sediments
Dynoides indicus, a species of isopod

Synonyms 
 Dihammus indicus, a synonym of Acalolepta indica, a species of longhorn beetle

See also 
 Indicus (disambiguation)